S.E.S. (Hangul: 에스이에스; acronym for Sea, Eugene, Shoo) was a South Korean girl group formed in 1997 by SM Entertainment, featuring three members: Bada, Eugene, and Shoo. Their debut album I'm Your Girl sold 650,000 copies, becoming the third best-selling album by a female group in South Korea. Their follow-up albums, Sea & Eugene & Shoo in 1998, Love in 1999 and A Letter from Greenland in 2000 also became best-sellers.

Early in their career, they were dubbed as the female counterpart of H.O.T., who were also their labelmates. S.E.S. were challenged by groups like Fin.K.L, Jewelry and Baby V.O.X, which debuted around the same time and were also largely successful.

The group officially disbanded in December 2002, after unsuccessful contract renewal negotiations with Bada and Eugene while Shoo maintained her career with SM until 2006. They released the compilation album Beautiful Songs in mid-2003 as their final release.

In October 2016, the group's members were confirmed to form a reunion in order to celebrate their debut's 20th anniversary. SM later confirmed that the group would return with an album and a concert. In November 2016, the group's released the buzz single "Love [story]" under SM's music project SM Station as a part of their 20th anniversary project, which would later include a concert, an album and a reality program. Their 20th anniversary special album Remember was released on January 2, 2017, with double title tracks "Remember" and "Paradise".

History

1996–1997: Formation

Their official biography video states that Bada was the first one to be discovered, when Lee Soo-man saw her singing at her performing arts school in 1996. Taken by her voice, he quickly offered her a recording contract. Eugene, on the other hand, was not cast in person. Instead, she sent in a video from Guam, where she was living at the time, showcasing her bubbly personality. It reached SM executives, who agreed that she could be a star. The last member to be cast was Shoo, who was the only one to go through a "real" audition process. They quickly began training, going through voice, dance, and interview lessons.

1997–1998: Debut and Sea & Eugene & Shoo
They released their first album, I'm Your Girl and had their public debut on November 28, 1997. Their image at the time was very innocent, with their discography consisting mostly of love songs. In much of their promotional work, including an appearance on Lee Sora's "Propose" show, they displayed their multiple abilities: Eugene demonstrated her piano playing, while Bada and Shoo sung together. Eventually, the singles "I'm Your Girl" (which had future Shinhwa members Eric Mun and Andy Lee rapping in the introduction) and "Oh, My Love!" became huge hits for S.E.S., and they quickly became one of the top-selling groups in K-Pop.

Their second album, Sea & Eugene & Shoo, was released in 1998. The single "Dreams Come True", a cover of Finnish group Nylon Beat's "" ("Like a Fool"), became a hit along with "너를 사랑해 (I Love You)". Eventually, the album sold over 650,000 copies. Meguriau Sekai, a Japanese album, was released in the same year. In between their Korean albums, S.E.S. continued to release Japanese singles and albums, but those were never as widely received as their Korean works.

1999–2000: Love and rising popularity
At the end of 1999, their third album Love was released. It became their best-selling album, with over 762,000 copies sold. The title song from the album, "Love", a mid-tempo pop song, also became a success for the trio. The music video that accompanied the track was filmed in New York City and cost over US$1,000,000, an amount considered large for a music video at that time. The band's dark concept was later dropped at the end of their promotional schedule, and all three members reverted to a simpler image; the dance for "Twilight Zone" was subsequently changed as well. Promotional activities resumed at the end of January 2000.

2000: A Letter From Greenland

In December 2000, S.E.S.'s fourth album, A Letter From Greenland was released. "감싸 안으며 (Show Me Your Love)" was the first single from the album. A cover of j-pop star Misia's "Tsutsumi Komu Youni...", the song was a slow, ballad influenced by jazz. This single and album continued S.E.S.'s winning streak, helping to cement their status as K-pop's top group at the time. The second single, "Be Natural", also did fairly well, even though under-promoted in comparison to the first.

2001: Surprise

In the summer of 2001, a special album was released (receiving the ".5" label). Called Surprise, their 4.5th album was a collection of their Japanese songs re-recorded in Korean (with new instrumentals). The first single, "꿈을 모아서 (Just In Love)", brought S.E.S. back to a happy, poppy theme, although they avoided the cutesy images from their debut. The video was filmed in Thailand, and it matched the sunny theme of the song. The track was successful, and counted with heavy promotion. Promotions, however, were cut short after member Bada collapsed from exhaustion during a performance on one of Korea's major music shows. Because of that, their other singles from the album were released without newly filmed music videos, with them being compilation or montage videos instead. The album underperformed compared to the group's previous works, although it still managed to sell more than 350,000 copies.

2002: Choose My Life-U and Friend

Their major comeback album, Choose My Life-U was released in early spring of 2002. This was a continuation of their sophisticated theme, with the album booklet full of suggestive pictures of the girls. Their first single "U" was quite different, being very dance-intensive; the video showed the girls in dominant roles and positions, with Eugene even becoming a dominatrix for one scene. This song also did well and returned S.E.S. to the top of the charts. "Just A Feeling", their second single from this album, was an energetic dance track with an equally energetic video. However, their promotional schedule for the song was limited and it was not performed as often as their other singles. "Feeling" became one of their few singles to not hit the top spot on the music show charts.

Their comeback album Friend (their "5.5"th), was released at the end of the same year. The main single was titled "Soul II Soul (S.II.S.)", which was a play on words (as the number 2 can be pronounced as "E" in Korean). In the dark-themed music video, Bada is seen writing letters while crying, Eugene is cutting up bunnies in a room (suggesting mental instability), and Shoo is seen caressing a large ball of light on her bed. The song was never performed on television.

2003–2015: Post-disbandment activities and reunions 

After releasing the compilation album Beautiful Songs, members followed solo careers in music and acting.

In 2007, the group celebrate their 10th anniversary, and in 2008, they appeared as a group on the South Korean show Happy Sunday. In October 2009, they made another appearance together on the show Come To Play.

In 2014, their song "Be Natural" was remade by their labelmate girl group Red Velvet, which at the time consisted of 4 members. The track served as their second official single.
Also in that year, members Bada and Shoo appeared as guests on the show Infinite Challenge, as a part of their 1990s-themed special Saturday, Saturday, I Am A Singer. At the occasion, Eugene was absent due to pregnancy and was represented by Girls' Generation member Seohyun.

2016–2017: 20th anniversary project 

On May 28, 2016, S.E.S attended the charity event Green Heart Bazaar. A few months later, on October, it was announced that S.E.S. would make an official comeback to the music scene in 2016, almost 20 years since the release of their debut album. On November 23, the group's schedule was revealed by their record label, with the official announcement of a special celebrative album. On November 23, the group's comeback project #Remember was revealed, detailing S.E.S.'s upcoming releases. On November 28, S.E.S. released the song "Love [story]", a remake of their 1997 song "I'm Your Girl" and 1999 song "Love", through the SM Station project. Its music video was released on December 29.

Starting from December 5, the group starred in the ten episode reality show Remember, I'm Your S.E.S., broadcast through mobile app Oksusu. They also held a two-day concert "Remember The Day", on December 30 and 31 at Sejong University's Daeyang Hall in Seoul. On December 17, 2016, S.E.S. performed on You Hee-yeol's Sketchbook.

On December 27, it was announced that S.E.S.'s new album would be titled Remember, and would contain two main singles.  Two days later, previews for the music videos of main singles "Remember" and "Paradise" were released alongside the full music video of "Love [story]". The first single "Remember" was officially released prior to the album on January 1, with its music video; the second single "Paradise" was released on January 2, also with its music video, alongside the full album.

On March 1, they held a fanmeet called "I Will Be There, Waiting For You".

Discography 

Korean albums
 I'm Your Girl (1997)
 Sea & Eugene & Shoo (1998)
 Love (1999)
 A Letter from Greenland (2000)
 Choose My Life-U (2002)
 Remember (2017)
Japanese albums
 Reach Out (1999)
 Be Ever Wonderful (2000)

Concerts
 A Sweet Kiss from The World of Dream (2000)
 Remember, the Day (2016)

Awards and nominations

Other honors

Listicles

See also
 List of best-selling girl groups

References

External links 
 Official Site  

1997 establishments in South Korea
2002 disestablishments in South Korea
2016 establishments in South Korea
2017 disestablishments in South Korea
Japanese pop music groups
J-pop music groups
K-pop music groups
MAMA Award winners
Musical groups disestablished in 2002
Musical groups disestablished in 2017
Musical groups established in 1997
SM Entertainment artists
SM Town
South Korean contemporary R&B musical groups
South Korean dance music groups
South Korean expatriates in Japan
South Korean girl groups